Wallumrød is a surname. Notable people with the surname include:

Christian Wallumrød (born 1971), Norwegian jazz musician and composer
David Wallumrød (born 1977), Norwegian pianist
Fredrik Wallumrød (born 1973), Norwegian drummer and composer
Susanna Wallumrød (born 1979), Norwegian vocalist